Max C. Middendorf (born August 18, 1967) is an American retired ice hockey player. He played 13 games in the National Hockey League with the Quebec Nordiques and Edmonton Oilers between 1986 and 1990. The rest of his career, which lasted from 1986 to 1998, was mainly spent in the minor leagues.

Playing career
The 6 ft 4in (195 cm) center was drafted by the Sudbury Wolves of the Ontario Hockey League in 1984.

He joined the OHL club after a spectacular offensive season with the New Jersey Rockets, where he netted 94 goals and 168 points in 58 games as a 16-year-old.

In 63 games with the Wolves in his rookie year he produced 16 goals and 44 points along with a noticeable willingness to play a rough and tumble game, with 106 minutes in penalties.

The Quebec Nordiques selected him in the third round of the 1985 NHL draft, 57th overall. He played parts of three NHL seasons in Quebec before going to the Edmonton Oilers in the 1990–91 campaign.

Middendorf played 13 games in the National Hockey League, collecting 2 goals and 4 assists.

Career statistics

Regular season and playoffs

International

External links
 

1967 births
Living people
Adirondack Red Wings players
American men's ice hockey centers
Bakersfield Fog players
Cape Breton Oilers players
EC KAC players
Edmonton Oilers players
Fort Wayne Komets players
Fort Worth Brahmas players
Fredericton Express players
Halifax Citadels players
Huntsville Channel Cats (CHL) players
Ice hockey players from New Jersey
Ice hockey players from New York (state)
Kitchener Rangers players
People from Wyckoff, New Jersey
Quebec Nordiques draft picks
Quebec Nordiques players
Saint Joseph Regional High School alumni
San Diego Barracudas players
San Diego Gulls (IHL) players
Sportspeople from Syracuse, New York
Sudbury Wolves players
Winston-Salem Mammoths players